Colin James and the Little Big Band II is a swing-jive album by Canadian musician Colin James, released in 1999 (see 1999 in music).

Colin James and the Little Big Band II earned James the 1999 Juno Award for "Best Producer".

Track listing 
 "Jumpin' from Six to Six" – 2:54  	 
 "Safronia B" – 2:15
 "Mary Anne" – 3:34
 "Let's Shout (Baby Work Out)" – 3:12
 "You Know My Love" – 3:27
 "I'll See It Through" – 3:46 	
 "C'mon with the C'mon" – 2:57
 "Rocket to the Moon" – 3:42
 "Think" – 3:52
 "Somethin's Goin' On in My Room" – 2:35
 "I'm Lost Without You" – 3:04
 "Tin Pan Alley" – 4:27
 "Triple Shot" – 3:59
 "Bring It On Home" – 3:55

Personnel 
 Colin James  - vocals, guitars
 Greg Piccolo - tenor and alto saxophones
 Kaz Kazanoff - baritone and tenor saxophones
 Brian Casserly - trumpet, vocals
 John Wolf    - trombone, bass trombone, vocals
 Reese Wynans - Hammond organ, piano
 George Rains - drums
 Norm Fisher - stand-up bass, electric bass, vocals
 Eric Webster - Hammond organ, piano, vocals (tracks 3, 8, 10, and 14)
 Al Webster - drums, vocals (tracks 3, 8, 10, and 14)

References

External links 
 Colin James and then Little Big Band II

Colin James albums
1999 albums